Matlaccoatzin was an Ecatepec Tlatoani, father of Chimalpilli II, Tlacuilolxochtzin and Tlapalizquixochtzin.

References

Tlatoque of Ecatepec
Nahua nobility
1427 births
1465 deaths
15th-century monarchs in North America
15th-century indigenous people of the Americas
15th century in the Aztec civilization
Nobility of the Americas